Dance Alone may refer to:
Dance Alone (EP), a 2013 EP by Logan Lynn
"Dance Alone" (song), a 2017 single by Jana Burčeska
"Dance Alone", single from Keke Palmer discography
"Dance Alone", single by No More Kings from And the Flying Boombox (2009)
"Dance Alone", song by Tayla Parx from her album Coping Mechanisms (2020)

See also
"They Dance Alone", 1988 single by Sting